Thierry Kasereka (born 2 July 1988) is a Congolese football defender who plays for AS Nyuki.

References

1988 births
Living people
Democratic Republic of the Congo footballers
Democratic Republic of the Congo international footballers
AS Vita Club players
Al-Hilal Club (Omdurman) players
FC Renaissance du Congo players
AS Dauphins Noirs players
Linafoot players
Association football defenders
Democratic Republic of the Congo expatriate footballers
Expatriate footballers in Sudan
Democratic Republic of the Congo expatriate sportspeople in Sudan
Democratic Republic of the Congo A' international footballers
2011 African Nations Championship players
Sportspeople from Goma